Thomas Hörl (born 20 August 1981) is an Austrian former ski jumper who competed from 1997 to 2003.

Career
After winning the Alpen Cup in 1996 at the age of fifteen, together with medalling in junior level competitions, Hörl started his senior level World Cup career in Bischofshofen on 8 January 2000.

Hörl retired from ski jumping after the 2003 Continental Cup season.

Ski jumping world record

References

External links

1981 births
Austrian male ski jumpers
Living people
People from Saalfelden
World record setters in ski flying
Sportspeople from Salzburg (state)